The Women's 10 metre air pistol event at the 2012 Olympic Games took place on 29 July 2012 at the Royal Artillery Barracks.

The event consisted of two rounds: a qualifier and a final. In the qualifier, each shooter fired 40 shots with an air pistol at 10 metres distance. Scores for each shot were in increments of 1, with a maximum score of 10.

The top 8 shooters in the qualifying round moved on to the final round. There, they fired an additional 10 shots. These shots scored in increments of .1, with a maximum score of 10.9. The total score from all 50 shots was used to determine final ranking.

Records
Prior to this competition, the existing world and Olympic records were as follows.

Qualification round

Final

References

Shooting at the 2012 Summer Olympics
Olymp
Women's events at the 2012 Summer Olympics